Shahenshah is a 1970 Marathi historical fiction novel by N S Inamdar. The story is a fictional biography of the Mughal emperor Muhi-ud-Din Muhammad, otherwise popularly known as Aurangzeb. Under his reign the Mughal Empire achieved its largest expansion and also saw a rapid downfall, disintegrating shortly after his death. The novel focuses on his 50-year reign and is about an Emperor who is feared by all and is extremely intelligent yet faces a heartbroken and lonely death. Hence the title Shahanshah, which is a title given to emperors.

English translation

The book was translated to English as "Shahenshah - The Life of Aurangzeb" by Vikrant Pande and published by Harper Perennial in 2016.

References

External links 
 Harpercollins.in: Shahenshah - The Life of Aurangzeb

1970 novels
Marathi novels by N S Inamdar
Indian historical novels
1970 Indian novels